Multi-Player Soccer Manager is football management computer game released for the ZX Spectrum, Commodore 64 and Amstrad CPC in 1991.

Gameplay
The player begins the game managing a Division 4 team and plays a 30-game season where the team must finish in the top two to gain promotion.  If they finish bottom, the player wins the "league joker" trophy.  In higher leagues, the bottom two teams are relegated to the lower division.  If the player performs well as a manager, they may be offered a new club at a higher-level club.  Players also compete in League Cup and FA Cup matches as well.  Other features include buying and selling players in the transfer market, organising training for your players and increase your ground's capacity and safety.  If the player runs out of money, they will be sacked and offered the job of the bottom team of Division 4, if they choose not to take the job, the game will reset, the same occurs if the player resigns at any time.  Up to four players can take part at the same time with all players starting at Division 4. The Amiga and PC versions had up to eight players.

A common bug in the game was the dreaded 'Sleigh Bogey', which appeared at seemingly random points during seasons. It would appear when you were viewing results for a game. If 'Sleigh Bogey' appeared, it was game over. You could then not continue the game. Also of note was that if you over loaded on midfielders your team would be more likely to win.

External links
 

1991 video games
ZX Spectrum games
Commodore 64 games
Amstrad CPC games
Association football management video games
Multiplayer and single-player video games
Video games developed in the United Kingdom